Pelham Davis Glassford (August 8, 1883 – August 9, 1959) was a United States Army officer who attained the rank of brigadier general during World War I. He later served as Superintendent of the District of Columbia Police Department, and was in large measure held responsible for the violence that ended the 1932 Bonus Army protests.

The son of a career Army officer, Glassford graduated from the United States Military Academy in 1904 and was commissioned in the Field Artillery. His early assignments included the 1st Field Artillery Regiment at Fort Riley, the West Point faculty and 1st Field Artillery postings to the Philippines and Hawaii. In 1916 and 1917 he served with the 5th Field Artillery during the Pancho Villa Expedition.

During World War I, Glassford directed two artillery schools in France, commanded a Field Artillery regiment, and then commanded a Field Artillery brigade. He was promoted to brigadier general in 1918, and was the Army’s youngest general officer at the time.

After the war, Glassford commanded a Field Artillery Brigade in the Army of Occupation. He also graduated from the Army War College, served in several staff and faculty assignments, and commanded the 1st Field Artillery Regiment. He retired from the Army in 1931.

Following his military retirement, Glassford was Superintendent of the District of Columbia Police, a position he resigned because of disagreement over the actions taken against the Bonus Army in 1932. He subsequently served briefly as chief of police in Phoenix, and was a federal labor-management mediator in California. During World War II, Glassford returned to active duty and served for nearly two years in the office of the Provost Marshal General.

In his later years, Glassford’s hobbies included painting; he created landscapes and seascapes in watercolors.  His works continue to be exhibited, and are bought and sold by collectors.

Glassford died in California in 1959. He was buried at Fort Rosecrans National Cemetery.

Early life
Glassford was born in Las Vegas, New Mexico on August 8, 1883, the son of Allie (Seymour) Glassford and Army officer William A. Glassford (1853–1931).  He graduated from West Point in 1904 ranked 18th of 124 graduates, and was commissioned as a second lieutenant of Field Artillery.

Start of career
After his initial service at Fort Riley, Kansas, in 1907 Glassford was promoted to first lieutenant and graduated from the Mounted Service School.  He was then posted to West Point to serve on the faculty as an instructor in the department of drawing.

From 1911 to 1913, Glassford served in the Philippines with the 1st Field Artillery Regiment.  In 1913 he was assigned to Hawaii with the 1st Field Artillery, and in 1914 he was promoted to captain.

In 1916 and 1917, Glassford served on the US-Mexico border with the 5th Field Artillery during the Pancho Villa Expedition.  At the start of World War I, he was promoted to major and assigned as adjutant of the 5th Field Artillery during its premobilization training.

World War I
Upon arrival in France with his regiment, Glassford was promoted to temporary lieutenant colonel and assigned as secretary of the Field Artillery School of Instruction in Saumur.  He was subsequently assigned as director of the I Corps field artillery school.  In early 1918, Glassford returned to the Saumur school as commandant, and he served until he was promoted to temporary colonel and named commander of the 103rd Field Artillery Regiment in June.

Glassford commanded the 103rd Field Artillery until August, and took part in several battles, including Xivray-et-Marvoisin, the Second Battle of the Marne, the Battle of Château-Thierry, and the Meuse-Argonne Offensive.  He was wounded in September, but continued in command.

In October, Glassford was promoted to temporary brigadier general and assigned to command the 51st Field Artillery Brigade, 26th Division; at the time of this promotion, he was the youngest general officer in the Army.  During the war, Glassford became known for riding a motorcycle between his subordinate units so he could perform reconnaissance and conduct command and control based on personal observations rather than reports to a command post.  Glassford trained his brigade to become proficient in the technique of reloading on a cannon's recoil; while this practice posed risk to crew members who might be injured by the moving recoil mechanism, it enabled 26th Division artillery crews to shoot so fast that German soldiers were convinced the Americans had automatic fire artillery pieces.

Post-World War I
Glassford commanded the 51st Field Artillery Brigade until February 1919, when he was assigned to command the 152nd Field Artillery Brigade, a unit of the 77th Division.  He returned to the United States with his brigade in July, reverted to his permanent rank of major, and was assigned to the office of the Chief of Field Artillery.  Later that year he was assigned to the faculty of the General Service Schools at Ft. Leavenworth.

In 1924, Glassford graduated from the Army War College, after which he remained at the school to serve on the faculty.  In 1927 and 1928, Glassford commanded the 1st Field Artillery Regiment at Fort Sill.

Glassford subsequently returned to the War Department staff and served as chief of the Mobilization Branch in the Operations and Training Division. He was promoted to lieutenant colonel in 1928.  Glassford retired in July 1931, and his rank of brigadier general was restored at his retirement as the result of a 1930 law which enabled World War I generals to retire at the highest rank they had held.

During his career, Glassford was known for his out of the ordinary excursions into fields outside the Army.  He would frequently save his military leave, and then use it in large blocs to take long motorcycle trips or work in jobs that were atypical for a military professional, which included circus barker and newspaper reporter.

Later career

Washington, DC police chief
In November 1931, Glassford was appointed Superintendent of the District of Columbia’s Metropolitan Police Department.  Known for his sense of humor, when queried by a reporter as to his qualifications for the job, Glassford quipped: "Well, I've been arrested.  Once for driving through a red light and once for speeding on a motorcycle."  His tenure was most notable for the Summer 1932 response to the Bonus Army, World War I veterans who converged on Washington during the Great Depression to advocate for early payment of bonuses that were scheduled to be paid in 1945.

Members of the Bonus Army established encampments in and around the District of Columbia.  Glassford worked to accommodate them, visiting their leaders daily by motorcycle to help maintain order, and arranging for volunteers to provide medical care, as well as donations of food, clothing, tents, and other supplies.  Favorable Congressional action was not forthcoming, and many Bonus Army members accepted the government's offer of free transportation home.  President Herbert Hoover ordered the remaining veterans to be removed, by force if necessary.  Glassford managed to obtain a six day extension before enforcement, hoping to persuade the Bonus Army members to depart voluntarily.  On July 28, U.S. Attorney General William D. Mitchell ordered the veterans who remained to be removed from government property.  Glassford’s police began to execute the order; they were met with resistance, and during an exchange of shots, two veterans were wounded and later died.

After the shooting, President Herbert Hoover ordered the Army to force the veterans' out of the Washington area.  General Douglas MacArthur, the Chief of Staff of the Army, took personal command of infantry and cavalry units, which were supported by six tanks. The Army forcibly ejected the Bonus Army members, and wives and children who had accompanied some of them were also forced to leave.  The Army then burned the campsites.

Glassford had established a positive relationship with leaders of the Bonus Army, and disagreed with Hoover and Mitchell about the need to eject the members and destroy the campsites.  He also disagreed with the need to use Army troops against the Bonus Army, which brought him into conflict with other members of the police department leadership.  When Glassford was unable to name appointees who agreed with his policies, he submitted his own resignation, and left the police department in December 1932.

Move to Arizona
Glassford retired to a farm near Phoenix.  He mounted a brief run for governor of Arizona in 1934, and also that year accepted a federal appointment to mediate labor-management disputes between workers and owners of lettuce and cantaloupe farms in Imperial Valley, California.  Faced with workers striking in an effort to obtain better pay and working conditions, conservative farm owners resorted to violence, spying on attorneys sent to California to aid the workers, and propaganda asserting that the strike was communist-inspired.  Though Glassford was initially sympathetic to the farm owners, their tactics caused him to come down on the side of the workers.

Phoenix police chief
In March 1936, Glassford was hired to serve as chief of the Phoenix Police Department for 90 days.  The temporary appointment came with a mandate to reorganize and reform the department to end corruption and outside political influence, and restore morale.  He left the position on May 1, when a new mayor and city council took office and decided on a different reorganization plan.  In September 1936, Glassford was an unsuccessful candidate for the Democratic nomination in Arizona's 1st congressional district.

World War II
In March 1942, Glassford was recalled to active duty for World War II and assigned to duty as internal security director in the office of the Provost Marshal General.  He retired again in December 1943.

Awards
Glassford was a recipient of the Distinguished Service Medal, Silver Star, Legion of Merit, and Purple Heart.

Career as artist
Glassford was an artist; among friends in the military, he was well known for his paintings of fireplace screens.  After his military retirement, he worked primarily in watercolors; his second wife and he resided in Laguna Beach, California, and many of Glassford’s paintings depicted scenes of Newport Beach, Balboa Harbor and other areas of the southern California coast.

Death and burial
Glassford died in Laguna Beach on August 9, 1959.  He was buried at Fort Rosecrans National Cemetery in San Diego.

Family
In 1908, Glassford married Cora Carleton (1887–1958), the daughter of US Army General Guy Carleton (1857–1946).  They were the parents of four children: Guy Carleton (1908–1974), Cora Elizabeth (Mrs. Lee Parke) (1910–1986), Pelham Davis (1911–1992), and Dorothy Seymour (Mrs. William Graham) (1913–1977).

The Glassfords divorced in 1932. In 1934, Pelham Glassford married Lucille Painter (1906–1957).

Glassford’s brother William A. Glassford, was a graduate of the United States Naval Academy who attained the rank of vice admiral before retiring in 1946.

Biography
Cora Carleton Glassford prepared a biography of her husband, One Life is Not Enough, the manuscript for which is part of the Cora Carleton Glassford Papers.  Cora Carleton Glassford's papers are included in the collections of the Daughters of the Republic of Texas Library.

References

Sources

Books

Newspapers

Internet

External links

Finding Aid for the Pelham Davis Glassford Papers, 1904-1959 at the University of California at Los Angeles: Library Special Collections, Charles E. Young Research Library

1883 births
1959 deaths
United States Army Field Artillery Branch personnel
People from Las Vegas, New Mexico
People from Laguna Beach, California
United States Military Academy alumni
United States Army War College alumni
Recipients of the Distinguished Service Medal (US Army)
Recipients of the Silver Star
Recipients of the Legion of Merit
Chiefs of the Metropolitan Police Department of the District of Columbia
Burials at Fort Rosecrans National Cemetery
United States Army generals of World War II
United States Army generals
United States Army generals of World War I
Military personnel from New Mexico
Arizona Democrats